Vocabulon is a French language educational video game, produced by Megableu and Index+ in 1998. It was released for both Microsoft Windows based PCs and Apple Macintosh computers.

The aim of the game is to save the world of words (Vocabulon) from the diabolical professor Charabia, who has built a machine which devours letters. The player has to bring a bomb into his den, where the player finds each letter, which composes the code, on islands of Vocabulon.

External links 
 Vocabulon at Microïds

Windows games
Classic Mac OS games
1998 video games
Microïds games
Language learning video games
Video games developed in France